"Nation language" is the term coined by scholar and poet Kamau Brathwaite and now commonly preferred to describe the work of writers from the Caribbean and the African diaspora in non-standard English, as opposed to the traditional designation of it as "dialect", which Brathwaite considered carries pejorative connotations that are inappropriate and limiting. 

In the words of Kamau Brathwaite, who is considered the authority of note on nation language and a key exemplar of its use: We in the Caribbean have a [...] kind of plurality: we have English, which is the imposed language on much of the archipelago. It is an imperial language, as are French, Dutch and Spanish. We also have what we call creole English, which is a mixture of English and an adaptation that English took in the new environment of the Caribbean when it became mixed with the other imported languages. We have also what is called nation language, which is the kind of English spoken by the people who were brought to the Caribbean, not the official English now, but the language of slaves and labourers, the servants who were brought in.

Writers who also notably use nation language include Samuel Selvon, Louise Bennett, John Figueroa, Archie Markham, Linton Kwesi Johnson, Marc Matthews, John Agard, Jean Binta Breeze, as well as others of a younger generation. Poet and scholar Mervyn Morris ("one of the first academics to espouse the importance of nation language in helping to define in verse important aspects of Jamaican culture", according to Ralph Thompson) identifies V. S. Reid's 1949 novel New Day as the first literary work to use Jamaican vernacular as the language of narration.

In his History of the Voice (1984), Brathwaite discusses the prominence of pentameter in English poetic tradition, claiming that since the time of Chaucer, and with a few notable exceptions, pentameter has been the prevailing rhythm of English poetry. Brathwaite suggests that such imported literary forms may not be suitable to express the Caribbean experience. He writes, "The hurricane does not roar in pentameters." It is here that nation language becomes of use to the Caribbean poet:

Brathwaite describes reading an article by the Martinician poet and critic Édouard Glissant, in which Glissant describes nation language as a "forced poetics" because it was used strategically by slaves in order to both disguise and maintain their culture.

See also

 Jamaican patois 
 Creole language
 Guyanese Creole
 Spanglish
 Trinidadian and Tobagonian English

References

External links
 "Nation Language", LiteratureAlive Online.
 
 Brandon Brown, "Brathwaite's 'Nation Language,' Saro-Wiwa, and Achebe", African Postcolonial Literature in English in the Postcolonial Web, 1997.

English-based pidgins and creoles
Sociolinguistics
Diglossia
Languages of the African diaspora